The 1992 Grote Prijs Jef Scherens was the 26th edition of the Grote Prijs Jef Scherens cycle race and was held on 30 August 1992. The race started and finished in Leuven. The race was won by Hendrik Redant.

General classification

References

1992
1992 in road cycling
1992 in Belgian sport